The Israeli pavilion houses Israel's national representation during the Venice Biennale arts festivals.

Background

Organization and building 

The pavilion, designed by Zeev Rechter, was built between 1951 and 1952 and later restored by Fredrik Fogh in 1966.

Representation by year

Art 

 1982 — Tamar Getter, Michal Na'aman
 1986 — Nubani Ibrahim , Asad azi
 1988 — Zadok Ben-David
 1990 — Ya'acov Dorchin
 1993 — Avital Geva
 1995 — Joshua Neustein, Uri Tzaig (Curator: Gideon Ofrat)
 1997 — Yossi Berger, Miriam Cabessa, Sigalit Landau
 2001 — Uri Katzenstein (Curator: Yigal Zalmona)
 2003 — Michal Rovner
 2005 — Guy Ben-Ner (Curator: Sergio Edelzstein)
 2007 — Yehudit Sasportas (Curator: Suzanne Landau)
 2009 — Raffi Lavie (Curator: Doreet LeVitte Harten)
 2011 — Sigalit Landau (Curators: Jean de Loisy, Ilan Wizga)
 2013 — Gilad Ratman (Curator: Sergio Edelstein)
 2015 — Tsibi Geva (Curator: Hadas Maor)
 2017 — Gal Weinstein (Curator: Tami Katz-Freiman)
 2019 — Aya Ben Ron (Curator: Avi Lubin)

References

Bibliography

Further reading 

 
 
 
 
 
 https://www.blouinartinfo.com/news/story/3027947/israels-structures-of-negotiation-at-venice-architecture

Israeli contemporary art
National pavilions